Valur Snjólfur Ingimundarson (born 20 February 1962) is an Icelandic former basketball player and coach. He played for 20 seasons in the Icelandic Úrvalsdeild and is its highest scoring player of all time. He won the Icelandic championship eight times during his career and the Icelandic Cup twice.

Denmark
Valur was a player-coach for Odense BK from 1995 to 1998 and helped the club achieve promotion up two levels in two seasons and to the Danish top-tier league in 1997. He left Odense after the 1997-1998 season and to over as head coach for Tindastóll.

Icelandic national team
Valur is the second most capped player in the national team history, playing 164 games between 1980 and 1995.

Team of the 20th century
In 2001 Valur was voted to the Icelandic team of the 20th century in basketball as a player.

Personal life
Valur is the older brother of Sigurður Ingimundarson, the winningest coach in Icelandic basketball history, and the father of basketball player Valur Orri Valsson.

References

External links
Úrvalsdeild statistics at Icelandic Basketball Association

1962 births
Living people
Valur Ingimundarson
Valur Ingimundarson
Valur Ingimundarson
Valur Ingimundarson
Valur Ingimundarson
Valur Ingimundarson
Valur Ingimundarson
Valur Ingimundarson
Valur Ingimundarson
Small forwards
Valur Ingimundarson
Valur Ingimundarson
Valur Ingimundarson
Valur Ingimundarson
Valur Ingimundarson